The 1972 United States presidential election in Washington took place on November 7, 1972 as part of the 1972 United States presidential election. State voters chose nine representatives, or electors, to the Electoral College, who voted for president and vice president. 

Washington voted for the Republican incumbent, Richard Nixon, over the Democratic challenger, South Dakota Senator George McGovern. Nixon took 56.92% of the vote to McGovern's 38.64%, a margin of 18.28%, which still made the state 4.87% more Democratic than the nation at-large.

Nixon won every county except heavily unionized Grays Harbor and Pacific Counties, in the process being the first Republican to carry Wahkiakum County (another heavily unionized timber county), Kitsap County and Snohomish County since Herbert Hoover in 1928. 

Nixon's victory was the first of four consecutive Republican victories in the state, as Washington would not vote for a Democratic candidate again until Michael Dukakis in 1988. Since then it has become a safe Democratic state.

Results

Results by county

See also
 United States presidential elections in Washington (state)

References

1972
Washington
1972 Washington (state) elections